Papiamento has two standardised orthographies, one used on the island of Aruba and the other on the islands of Curaçao and Bonaire. The Aruban orthography is more etymological in nature, while the other is more phonemic. Among the differences between the two standards, one obvious difference is the way the name of the language is written. In Aruba it is written Papiamento, while in Curaçao and Bonaire it is written Papiamentu. The governments of Curaçao and Aruba formally standardised orthographic rules in 1976 and 1977, respectively.

History

Development 

The first efforts to formalise the language began in the early 1970s, with the first step made in 1969 in Curaçao. R.G. Römer presented to the Central Government of the Netherlands Antilles his  (Draft of a spelling for Papyamento). In 1970 the Maduro Commission consisting of eight members, R.G. Römer included, was formed. With a modified proposition, they presented their recommendations to the Minister of Education of the Netherlands Antilles. With further revision, the minister's recommendations were passed onto the Deputy of Education of Curaçao in 1975. Here a Jonis Commission was formed to advise the Curaçaoan government on the didactic aspects of the Römer-Maduro orthography. It was also in 1975 that the Central Government decided that each island within the Netherlands Antilles could choose their orthography. This was officially adopted in 1977.

After official approval, both islands embarked on programs to promote the language. A commission including Maduro and Jonis of previous commissions was appointed the task of publishing a new version of the Curaçaoan orthography, which appeared in 1983. While interest in the language seemed to grow, problems arose in Aruba. Rules seemed unclear and not comprehensive in certain areas. In 1992 this prompted the Minister of Welfare to name a commission with the purpose of clarification and reform of the Aruban orthography. The commission delivered its findings later that year. Three years later the Aruban government relayed these findings to a number of institutions for analysis and to gather input. In the course of a year, the Government collected the recommendations it had received and in 1997 the Ministry of Education and Labour named a second commission to analyse and incorporate the relevant annotations. Their findings were presented to the ministry later that year. It was near the end of 2006 when the Ministry of Education had inventarised all additional recommendations and the official version which takes these into account was published the next year.

Recognition 

Throughout this process of reform of the language's orthography were elevations in formal recognition of the language. The  (General administrative law) of the Netherlands was reformed in 1995 in great part to allow the use of the West Frisian language in governmental administration within the province of Friesland. This reform also allowed Papiamento and English to be used alongside Dutch within Aruba and the islands of the Netherlands Antilles. In 2003 the Aruban government passed a law concerning the official language of the island, making Papiamento and Dutch the official languages of Aruba. Four years later in 2007, the government of the Netherlands Antilles passed a similar law making Papiamentu, Dutch and English the official languages of the islands. With the dissolution of the Netherlands Antilles in 2010, the government of the Netherlands has maintained the official status of Papiamentu, English and Dutch in the Caribbean Netherlands. The official languages of Curaçao since then remain Papiamentu and Dutch.

Alphabet

Spelling-to-sound correspondences

Vowels and vowel combinations 

Double vowels and diphthongs 

In Papiamento, vowels appear in succession only when each is pronounced separately e.g.  (to reeducate). This rule is part of Papiamentu orthography as well. Moreover, in Papiamentu a diaeresis or trema , as may be used in the language of origin of various loan words, is never used to distinguish separate sounds like in Dutch or Spanish.

Diphthongs can be categorised as descending or ascending. The difference is a matter of pronunciation and, in Papiamentu, a matter of accent placement on the stressed syllable.

Semivowels 

Modified vowels 

The letters ,  and  represent the sounds ,  and  respectively. The sounds  and  appear often in Papiamentu. ,  ('Curaçao').

The orthography of the Aruban dialect makes no use of accents or diaeresis and while the spelling of loan words is adjusted when possible, often it is retained as in their original language.

Consonants and consonant combinations 

  The letter  (except the digraph ) appears almost only in proper names in Papiamentu.

Double consonants and digraphs 

Consonants are seldom doubled in Papiamento/u. In Papiamentu, numerals are written as one word, e.g. ('two hundred') and are another example of where consonants may appear twice, but in Papiamento they are not, e.g. /.

Use of C 

However, the use of  differs per dialect.

, .

Hard and soft G 

Many words are of Spanish origin and thus follow Spanish orthography to a certain extent. Like the hard and soft , the orthographies of both dialects follow the Spanish example in distinguishing between the hard and soft . ('shame'),  ('penguin').

Diacritics 

The Papiamentu dialect of Curaçao and Bonaire is the only one of the two that makes use of the grave accent , the diaeresis or trema  and the acute accent . Without an accent, words in Papiamentu take on a consistent manner of emphasis. The stress in words without any acute accent is always on the last syllable in words ending with a consonant and on the penultimate in words ending with a vowel. Words that do not follow the default stress have an acute accent above the vowel (or second vowel of a diphthong) of the stressed syllable.

Like Spanish, Papiamentu orthography distinguishes between four types of words:
  or oxytones: words with emphasis on the final syllable.
 Examples: , 
  or paroxytones: words with emphasis on the penultimate (second to last) syllable.
 Examples: , 
  or proparoxytones: from the Spanish word , words with emphasis on the antepenultimate (third to last) syllable.
 Examples: , 
 : from the Spanish word , words with emphasis on the preantepenultimate (fourth to last) syllable.
 Examples: , 

Stress is always placed on a syllable with a grave accent, e.g. , unless there is another syllable with an acute accent, e.g. . As such, vowels with grave accents are not altered to indicate stress on the syllable in which it is located.

Apocope 

In many cases in Papiamentu, the acute accent preserves emphasis in words of Spanish and/or Portuguese origin where they would otherwise have naturally occurred, i.e. without an acute accent. In these cases, words have undergone a seemingly systematic elision of final letters, or apocope. In verbs, the final -r in infinitive form and -do of past participles had been dropped, among other examples. This is resolved by the use of the acute accent.

Contractions 

In both dialects, phonological elision often takes place in colloquial speech and writing and orthographic rules take these contractions into account. The orthographic rules of Papiamentu in particular discourage the use of contractions, recommending that words be spelt out in full as much as possible.

  > 
  is only contracted when followed by a word beginning with a vowel, e.g.  >  ('he/she/it is here').
  is always affixed to the word following it.
  > 
  > 
  may be contracted whether preceded by a vowel or consonant, e.g. / > / ('sack of limes'), / > / ('John's house').
  is only affixed to the word preceding it if a phoneme is dropped from the preceding word as well, e.g.  >  ('Sandra's comb'), but  >  ('sunglasses').
 In some cases, words ending in an unstressed -er like / ('bottle') may be contracted without the use of an apostrophe, e.g. / > / ('bottle of water') and not /.
  > 
  is only contracted when followed by a word with a consonant, e.g.  >  (they don't know).
  is never affixed to other words.
  > /
  is only contracted when preceded by a word with a vowel, e.g.  > / (Anna will send it).
 Like , / is only affixed to the word preceding it if a phoneme is dropped from the preceding word as well.
 Because  is stressed and changes the stress of the word to which it is affixed, it is always accented in Papiamentu when contracted, e.g.  >  ('we made it').

Erroneous use 

Moreover,  is only contracted when followed by a consonant, not a vowel as in the aforementioned examples. ('I didn't believe').

As mentioned, like , is only contracted with the word preceding it if a phoneme is dropped from the preceding word as well. , however, has the unique property of changing the emphasis of the word before it. In Papiamentu,  should always take on the acute accent because it is stressed when contracted.

Notes

References 

 Papiamento.aw – Papiamento language website of the Aruba government (in Papiamento) 
 Aruba Papiamento language grammar (in Papiamento) 
 Aruba Papiamento spelling and orthography rules (in Papiamento) 
 Aruba Papiamento official wordlist
 Curaçao and Bonaire Papiamentu orthography rules and official wordlist (in Papiamentu) 

Languages of the Caribbean
Indo-European Latin-script orthographies
Papiamento